Sir Christopher Forster (c.1590 – c.1660) was an Anglo-Irish merchant who served several terms as Lord Mayor of Dublin.

In 1621 Forster was Sheriff of Dublin City, having become an alderman of the city. He served as Lord Mayor of Dublin in 1629–30, 1635–7, and 1638–9. In 1642, his name appears among those Dublin aldermen who were commissioned by Charles I of England to disarm Roman Catholics in the city during the Irish Confederate Wars. He was the Master of the Dublin Guild of Merchants from 1647 to 1649.

References

Year of birth uncertain
Year of death uncertain
17th-century Anglo-Irish people
High Sheriffs of Dublin City
Irish knights
Irish merchants
Lord Mayors of Dublin
People of the Irish Confederate Wars